Nikolai Efimovich Kuznetsov (1879–1970) was a Russian Empire and later a Soviet painter and theatre designer.  His teachers included Valentin Serov and Konstantin Korovin.  From 1916 to 1918 he exhibited with the Jack of Diamonds group; from 1915 to 1922 he was a member of the Free Art Society.  He began designing for the theatre in 1917.  His work continued to be exhibited after the Revolution.

Works

References
John Milner.  A Dictionary of Russian and Soviet Artists, 1420 - 1970.  Woodbridge, Suffolk; Antique Collectors' Club, 1993

1879 births
1970 deaths
Painters from the Russian Empire
Designers from the Russian Empire
Soviet painters